The Kingdom Heirs Quartet is a Southern gospel quartet based at Dollywood in Pigeon Forge, Tennessee.

History

The Kingdom Heirs formed in 1971 in Knoxville, Tennessee. Original members included Patty Wilson (alto), Jim Bluford (tenor), Gene McKinney (lead), Raymond Parker (bass), and a 13-year-old Gary Bilyeu (piano). Gary Arnold was added on bass guitar and 13-year-old drummer Jim Ford came close behind with Tom Bailey on Rhythm. The name Kingdom Heirs was chosen by the group from James 2:5.  After they began expanding their singing beyond local churches, Wilson, Parker, and Arnold left the group for various reasons, and Steve Gouge replaced Arnold on bass guitar in July 1971. Mike Shuemaker joined to sing baritone in August of that same year.

After learning of a group from near Sparta, Tennessee who was using the name Kingdom Heirs, rather than checking legal availability for Kingdom Heirs, the group simply added New and became the New Kingdom Heirs.  In 1974 they incorporated as a non-profit under that name. That same year Larry Hutson joined the group on lead guitar, Duane Wyrick became Bass vocal and in 1975 after short stints by Johnny Trott and Mark Nipper, Buddy Mulkey took tenor vocal, while Tommy Rowe assumed baritone vocal. Larry's father, Bill Hutson, began managing the group. From 1972 to 1982 their ministry grew substantially and their booking schedule began to expand. Manager Bill Hutson arranged TV, radio, church and concert appearances from Michigan to Florida. Along the way, well known gospel music promoter and host of the widely syndicated Mull's Singing Convention television show Rev. J. Bazzell Mull took note and started using the New Kingdom Heirs in concerts and television.

Rev. Mull's recommendation in 1977 opened the door for an audition and their first performance and long association with Silver Dollar City in Pigeon Forge, Tennessee, now Dollywood. They first sang at the October Craft Festival, then the spring Young Christians Day and mid-summer Mountain Music Festival, which all became annual appearances. In 1979, at the prompting of promoter Rev. J. Bazzell Mull, they secured a registered trademark for the name Kingdom Heirs, and dropped the word "new" from the group name and began recording and appearing as The Kingdom Heirs. The late'70s saw 3 new albums recorded on Trail Records and produced by Jim Hamell, of The Kingsmen, and Bobby All. By 1981, The Kingdom Heirs, with band, had expanded to a total of 12 members (including manager Bill Hutson) and recorded their 10th Anniversary Edition in Nashville, with acclaimed producer and musician Gary Prim.
In late 1982, after the departure earlier in the year of the band's bass singer of the previous eight years, Duane Wyrick, six more members of the band retired, including founding members Gene McKinney, Gary Bilyeu, and Jim Ford along with Steve Gouge, Buddy Mulkey and bass Jeff Crisp. With Wayne Mitchell who had replaced Tommy Rowe, Larry Hutson, George Beeler (who had replaced Jim Ford), steel player Ron Ward and manager Bill Hutson remaining, they brought in David McGill (lead), Steve French (baritone), Kreis French (bass guitar), and Randall Hunley (piano).

Musical career
The Kingdom Heirs perform multiple shows daily at Dollywood during the months that the park is open. While the park is closed, they tour just like any other group. The group has been at the park since 1977, when it was known as Silver Dollar City. It is estimated that they sing to over 2 million people each year – more than any other Southern gospel group. Despite a short travel schedule, the guys always take time to join in the Gospel Celebration at the National Quartet Convention.

The Kingdom Heirs have also had many top ten songs, and currently have had 31 top 5 songs in a row and 10 number 1 songs including their latest number 1 song, "I'll Know I'm Home" along with "The Borrowed Tomb" and "Just Beyond The Sunset" which is off of the Redeeming the Time.  Many other number 1s include, "Just Preach Jesus", "Tell Me Why" and "He Locked the Gates". Over the past years they have had 26 songs nominated for Song of the Year, including songs like  - "Just Beyond the Sunset" "Just Preach Jesus", "The Joys of Heaven", "That's Why I Love to Call His Name", "I Know I'm Going There", "Forever Changed", "What We Needed". The Kingdom Heirs have been nominated many times for industry awards such as the SGMA Awards and Dove Awards. Winning Newcomer Group of the Year in 1989, the group has been a constant favorite. The latest award is 2016 Band of the Year, which the band also won in 2002, 2004, 2005, 2006, 2013, and 2014.

Members 

The current group consists of Jeff Chapman (bass), Loren Harris (lead), Jacob Ellison (tenor), Andy Stringfield (baritone and piano), Dennis Murphy (drums), and Kreis French (owner and bass guitar).

Tenor
 Jim Bluford (1971–1974)
 Johnny Trot (1974–1975)
 Mark Nipper (1975)
 Buddy Mulkey (1975–1982)
 Wayne Mitchell (1982–1987)
 Rick Strickland (1987–1992)
 David Walker (1992–1994)
 David Sutton (1994–2002)
 Jodi Hosterman (2002–2005)
 Billy Hodges (2005–2011)
 Jerry A. Martin (2011–2021)
 Jacob Ellison (2021–present)

Lead
 Gene McKinney (1971–1982)
 David McGill (1982–1989)
 Clayton Inman (1989–1993)
 Steve Lacey (1994–1995)
 Arthur Rice (1995–2022)
 Loren Harris (2022–present)

Baritone
 Mike Shuemaker (1971–1975)
 Tommy Rowe (1975–1981)
 David McGill (1981)
 Wayne Mitchell (1981–1982)
 Steve French (1982–2014, died on June 22, 2016)
 Andy Stringfield (2014–2015, 2022–present)
 Brian Alvey (2015–2016)
 Loren Harris (2016–2022)

Bass
 Raymond Parker (1971)
 Duane Wyrick (1974–1982)
 Jeff Crisp (1982)
 Eric Hawkins (1982–1985)
 Jody Medford (1986)
 Bob Caldwell (1987–1992)
 Eric Bennett (1992–2002)
 Jeff Chapman (2002–present)

Alto
 Patty Wilson (1971)

Piano, keyboards
 Gary Bilyeu (1971–1982)
 Randall Hunley (1982–1992)
 Jamie Graves (1992–1998)
 Jeff Stice (1999–2002)
 Adam Harman (2002–2006)
 Joseph Cox (2007)
 Andy Stringfield (2007–present)

Drums
 Jim Ford (1971–1982)
 George Beeler (1982–1983)
 Rich Wilson (1984–88)
 Stephen Arant (1988–90)
 Dennis Murphy (1990–present)

Bass guitar
 Steve Gouge (1971–1982)
 Kreis French (1982–present)

Lead guitar
 Larry Hutson (1974–1983)

Steel guitar
 Dale McPhearson (1978–1979)
 Ron Ward (1979–1983)

Rhythm guitar
 Tom Bailey (1971–1972)

Line-ups

Discography

1972 That Day Is Almost Here
1973 All Aboard
1975 Especially For You
1976 Heaven On the Horizon
1976 Old Fashioned Gospel
1978 Seed Sower
1979 I'll Gain More Than I'm Missing
1981 10th Anniversary Edition
1982 The Kingdom Heirs (Later Changed To Vol. 5)
1983 Just Arrived
1984 Special Edition
1985 Southern Live
1986 Heirlooms
1986 The Good Times
1987 Favorites
1987 Pure Gold
1988 Classics
1988 Live In Concert (video)
1988 Steppin' On the Bright Side
1989 From the Heart
1990 Live At Dollywwod
1991 Good Christian Men Rejoice (Christmas)
1992 Extraordinary
1992 Telling the World
1993 Timeless
1994 Satisfied
1994 Song of Praise
1995 Forever Gold
1996 Feelin' At Home
1997 Anchored 
1997 Christian Family
1997 My Father Is Rich
1998 Anchored Live
1998 Reflections
1999 A Christmas Celebration  (Christmas)
1999 Talley Ho, Ho, Ho! (with Kirk Talley)
1999 The Journey Home
2000 City of Light
2000 Impressions (band)
2001 Classic Collection double CD
2001 Journey Home (video)
2001 Live In the Smokies (video)
2001 Shadows of the Past
2002 Anchored (video)
2002 City of Light (video)
2002 Gonna Keep Telling
2002 N' Tune (band)
2002 Together In Song (video)
2003 Going On With the Song
2003 Sing It Again
2004 Forever Changed
2004 Going On with the Song: Live (video)
2004 Lyrics Not Included (band)
2004 Spirit of Christmas
2005 Give Me the Mountain
2005 Series One
2006 Live in Grand Style (video)
2006 Off the Record
2006 White Christmas
2007 True to the Call
2008 From the Red Book Vol. 1
2009 From the Red Book Vol. 2
2009 When You Look at Me
2010 25th Anniversary
2010 It's Christmas
2010 Live at Dollywood (DVD/CD set)
2011 By Request
2011 We Will Stand Our Ground
2012 From the Red Book Vol. 3
2013 Redeeming the Time
2013 The Heart of Christmas
2015 30th Anniversary
2015 From the Red Book  Vol 4
2015 A New Look
2015 Glory to God in the Highest
2016 Something Good
2017 Last Big Thing
2019 Everything in Between
2019 Something Good Volume 2

References

External links 
Kingdom Heirs Website
Southern Gospel History website
 A historical website of the Kingdom Heirs start up and first 11 years

American Christian musical groups
Crossroads Music
Gospel quartets
Musical groups from Tennessee
Music of East Tennessee
Southern gospel performers